In electrochemistry, the diffusion layer, according to IUPAC, is defined as the "region in the vicinity of an electrode where the concentrations are different from their value in the bulk solution. The definition of the thickness of the diffusion layer is arbitrary because the concentration approaches asymptotically the value in the bulk solution". The diffusion layer thus depends on the diffusion coefficient of the analyte and, for voltammetric measurements, on the scan rate (V/s).

The value is physically relevant since the concentration of solute varies according to the expression derived from Fick's Laws:

where  is the error function. When  the concentration is approximately 52% of the bulk concentration:

At slow scan rates, the diffusion layer is large, on the order of micrometers, whereas at fast scan rates the diffusion layer is nanometers in thickness. The relationship is described in part by the Cottrell equation.

Relevant to cyclic voltammetry, the diffusion layer has negligible volume compared the volume of the bulk solution.  For this reason, cyclic voltammetry experiments have an inexhaustible supply of fresh analyte.

References

Diffusion